The Krewe du Vieux is a New Orleans Mardi Gras krewe more fully known as the Krewe du Vieux Carré.

History and formation
The parade begins in the Marigny and slowly meanders its way through the Vieux Carre ("Vieux Carre" being another term for the city's French Quarter).  It is one of the earliest parades of the New Orleans Carnival calendar, and is noted for wild satirical and adult themes, as well as for showcasing a large number of New Orleans' best brass bands.

The Krewe du Vieux was established in 1987 as a replacement of the Krewe of Clones, which flopped after the city tried to make it more respectable for visitors who stayed on in the city after the 1986 Superbowl. The Krewe de Vieux is actually an amalgamation of several smaller semi-independent krewes (or sub-krewes) that pool their resources together for parade permits and other expenses and obligations.  Several of the sub-krewes predate the Krewe du Vieux, originating as walking clubs or as sub-krewes of the defunct Krewe of Clones in the 1970s and early 1980s. The history behind the parade states that the ruling class of New Orleans wagered if they gave the common people one day a year to go crazy and mock the elites then the satiated masses would allow them to maintain control for the remainder of the year. Participation in the parade is open to anyone who is part of a sub-affiliated krewe in good standing.

Parade 
The Krewe du Vieux is perhaps simultaneously the most individualistic and the most traditional of all New Orleans parading krewes.  It has no large tractor-pulled floats like the larger krewes, using only old-style, small, human-drawn or mule-drawn floats interspersed with marchers on foot. Krewe du Vieux only has live music, hiring some of the city's best brass bands to march with them.  The floats are handmade and decorated by members of the respective sub-krewes, often with themes satirizing local politics and customs, sometimes of a bawdy nature — in such aspects arguably closer to early-19th-century Carnival traditions than any other Krewe currently parading.  The Krewe du Vieux is the only Krewe still allowed to parade through the French Quarter (other than some small walking Krewes on Mardi Gras Day); krewes with larger floats have been prohibited in the narrow streets of the old town since the 1970s. The parade is noted for its sophisticated floats, witty debauchery, open mockery of topical municipal campaigns, and wildly entertaining levels of tastelessness.

Parade theme 
Krewe du Vieux typically selects a parade theme pulling from ideas of political satire, sexuality, and local culture.

Kings and Queens of the Krewe du Vieux take their participation very seriously. Henri Schindler, who rode as King Sarcophagus I in 1993, showcased how far some "royal members" go in their celebration. Schindler designed his float and gathered an extensive court of royals as his leading entourage. While riding along the parade route, he stopped in front of the Boston Club--a traditional stop for toasting the Kings of Carnival--to lay a funeral wreath.

References

External links
KreweDuVieux.org

Mardi Gras in New Orleans